Miss Europe 1933 was the sixth annual Miss Europe and the fifth edition under French journalist Maurice de Waleffe. New Delegates from Norway and Scotland are competing in Miss Europe.
Withdraws are Miss Argentina and Miss Paris' South American Colony.

Charlotte Hartmann, who had been crowned Miss Germany before the Nazi seizure of power, was not allowed to attend by the new government but competed after the Miss Europe pageant allowed her to compete in secret.

Results

Placements

Delegates

 - Simone Eraerts
 - Karen Marie Lowert
 - Angela Ward
 - Jacqueline Bertin
 - Charlotte Hartmann
 - Júlia Gál
 - Ivana Fusco
 - Gudrun Hilditch Rygh
 - Dina Mihalcea
 - Avia Talbot
 (In exile)  - Tat’yana Maslova
 - Emilia Docet
 - Nazire Hanem
 - Dragica Ugarkovitch

References

External links

Miss Europe
May 1933 events
1933 in Spain
Beauty pageants in Spain
Events in Madrid